The 2020 Oceania Badminton Championships was the continental badminton championships in Oceania sanctioned by the Badminton Oceania, and Badminton World Federation. This championship was organized by Badminton Ballarat, and was the 15th edition of the Oceania Badminton Championships. It was held in Ballarat, Australia from 10 to 15 February 2020. The team event started in 13 February, and is the qualification stage for the 2020 Thomas & Uber Cup finals to be played in Denmark, while the individual event started in 10 February.

Venue  
The tournament was held at the Ken Kay Badminton Stadium, Ballarat, Australia.

Medalists

Individual event

Team event

Medal summary

Men's singles

Seeds 

 Abhinav Manota (champion)
 Anthony Joe (fourth round)
 Pit Seng Low (fourth round)
 Keith Mark Edison (second round)
 Jacob Schueler (quarterfinals)
 Peter Yan (fourth round)
 Niccolo Tagle (second round)
 Jack Yu (fourth round)
 Anthony Wong (third round)
 Ashwant Gobinathan (fourth round)
 Athi Selladurai (fourth round)
 Teoh Kai Chen (quarterfinals)
 Lin Yin Xiang (quarterfinals)
 Ronan Ho-Yagues (third round)
 Oon Hoe Keat (quarterfinals)
 Nathan Tang (semifinals)

 Finals 

 Top half 
 Section 1 

 Section 2 

 Section 3 

 Section 4 

 Bottom half 
 Section 5 

 Section 6 

 Section 7 

 Section 8 

 Women's singles 
 Seeds 

 Chen Hsuan-yu (champion)
 Louisa Ma (final) Sally Fu (quarterfinals) Tiffany Ho (semifinals) Jennifer Tam (third round) Celeste Lee (third round) Shaunna Li (quarterfinals) Esther Tau (third round) Finals 

 Top half 
 Section 1 

 Section 2 

 Bottom half 
 Section 3 

 Section 4 

 Men's doubles 
 Seeds 

 Simon Leung / Mitchell Wheller (quarterfinals) Oliver Leydon-Davis / Abhinav Manota (champions)
 Lin Ying Xiang / Teoh Kai Chen (semifinals) Lukas Defolky / Raymond Tam (semifinals) Finals 

 Top half 
 Section 1 

 Section 2 

 Bottom half 
 Section 3 

 Section 4 

 Women's doubles 
 Seeds 

 Setyana Mapasa / Gronya Somerville (champions)
 Sally Fu / Alyssa Tagle (final) Jessica Lim / Talia Saunders (withdrew) Tiffany Ho / Jodee Vega (semifinals) Finals 

 Top half 
 Section 1 

 Section 2 

 Bottom half 
 Section 3 

 Section 4 

 Mixed doubles 
 Seeds 

 Simon Leung / Gronya Somerville (champions)
 Oliver Leydon-Davis / Anona Pak (quarterfinals) Jacob Schueler / Jodee Vega (third round) Dhanny Oud / Jasmin Ng Chung Man (quarterfinals) Raymond Tam / Jessica Lim (semifinals) Otto Zhao Xing De / Victoria He (third round) Edward Lau / Shaunna Li (quarterfinals) Dylan Soedjasa / Alyssa Tagle (semifinals) Finals 

 Top half 
 Section 1 

 Section 2 

 Bottom half 
 Section 3 

 Section 4 

 Team event 
 Seeds 
The seeding, which is based on BWF world rankings on 3 December 2019, for both the men's and women's competition is the same:

Men's team

Women's team

 Men's team Australia vs. FijiNew Zealand vs. New CaledoniaTahiti vs. FijiAustralia vs. New CaledoniaNew Zealand vs. FijiAustralia vs. TahitiNew Caledonia vs. FijiNew Zealand vs. TahitiAustralia vs. New ZealandTahiti vs. New Caledonia Women's team Australia vs. TahitiNew Zealand vs. New CaledoniaAustralia vs. New CaledoniaNew Zealand vs. TahitiNew Caledonia vs. TahitiAustralia vs. New Zealand''

References

External links 
 Oceania Championships 2020
 Individual Tournament Link
 Team Tournament Link

Oceania Badminton Championships
Oceania Badminton Championships
International sports competitions hosted by Australia
Badminton tournaments in Australia
Oceania Badminton Championships